San Antonio Heights is a census-designated place (CDP) in the San Bernardino County, California. It is in the northern Pomona Valley and the foothills of the San Gabriel Mountains. The population was 3,371 at the 2010 census, up from 3,122 at the 2000 census.

Geography
San Antonio Heights is an area located at  (34.153008, -117.661433). The area is north of the city of Upland.

Climate
This region experiences hot, dry summers and mild, rainy winters, receiving more rainfall than most areas in Metro Los Angeles due to being situated in the upslope foothill regions and experiencing orographic effects which increase precipitation.  According to the Köppen Climate Classification system, San Antonio Heights has a hot-summer Mediterranean climate, abbreviated "Csa" on climate maps.

Demographics

2010
The 2010 United States Census reported that San Antonio Heights had a population of 3,371. The racial makeup of San Antonio Heights was 2,765 (82.0%) White (69.3% Non-Hispanic White), 67 (2.0%) African American, 24 (0.7%) Native American, 284 (8.4%) Asian, 15 (0.4%) Pacific Islander, 115 (3.4%) from other races, and 101 (3.0%) from two or more races. Hispanic or Latino of any race were 612 persons (18.2%).

The Census reported that 3,358 people (99.6% of the population) lived in households, 13 (0.4%) lived in non-institutionalized group quarters, and 0 (0%) were institutionalized.

There were 1,198 households, out of which 390 (32.6%) had children under the age of 18 living in them, 786 (65.6%) were opposite-sex married couples living together, 94 (7.8%) had a female householder with no husband present, 75 (6.3%) had a male householder with no wife present.  There were 53 (4.4%) unmarried opposite-sex partnerships, and 17 (1.4%) same-sex married couples or partnerships. 175 households (14.6%) were made up of individuals, and 88 (7.3%) had someone living alone who was 65 years of age or older. The average household size was 2.80.  There were 955 families (79.7% of all households); the average family size was 3.08.

The population was spread out, with 700 people (20.8%) under the age of 18, 281 people (8.3%) aged 18 to 24, 639 people (19.0%) aged 25 to 44, 1,182 people (35.1%) aged 45 to 64, and 569 people (16.9%) who were 65 years of age or older.  The median age was 46.3 years. For every 100 females, there were 101.1 males.  For every 100 females age 18 and over, there were 102.2 males.

The homeowner vacancy rate was 0.8%; the rental vacancy rate was 5.4%.  2,851 people (84.6% of the population) lived in owner-occupied housing units and 507 people (15.0%) lived in rental housing units.

According to the 2010 United States Census, San Antonio Heights had a median household income of $106,905, with 2.9% of the population living below the federal poverty line.

2000
As of the census of 2000, there were 3,122 people, 1,081 households, and 891 families residing in the CDP. The population density was 2,228.7 inhabitants per square mile (861.0/km). The racial makeup of the CDP was 85.4% White, 1.4% African American, 0.7% Native American, 6.1% Asian, <0.1% Pacific Islander, 3.1% from other races, and 3.3% from two or more races. Hispanic or Latino of any race were 10.5% of the population.

There were 1,081 households, out of which 35.0% had children under the age of 18 living with them, 70.3% were married couples living together, 8.0% had a female householder with no husband present, and 17.5% were non-families. 12.6% of all households were made up of individuals, and 5.4% had someone living alone who was 65 years of age or older.  The average household size was 2.9 and the average family size was 3.1.

In the CDP, the population was spread out, with 24.4% under the age of 18, 7.3% from 18 to 24, 24.1% from 25 to 44, 29.5% from 45 to 64, and 14.6% who were 65 years of age or older.  The median age was 42 years. For every 100 females, there were 94.5 males.  For every 100 females age 18 and over, there were 95.8 males.

The median income for a household in the CDP was $75,557, and the median income for a family was $80,975. Males had a median income of $56,576 versus $30,929 for females. The per capita income for the CDP was $36,267.  About 4.8% of families and 6.9% of the population were below the poverty line, including 8.1% of those under age 18 and 0.4% of those age 65 or over.

Public safety
Law enforcement is provided by the San Bernardino County Sheriff's Department.
Fire, rescue, and EMS is provided by the San Bernardino County Fire Department.
American Medical Response provides additional EMS and patient transportation.

Star house and Community
Beginning in 1958, a private residence directly north of Euclid Avenue in San Antonio Heights displayed an enormous five-point star of lights each holiday season. Traditionally the 35-foot star was lit each night between Thanksgiving and New Year's Day and was visible for miles throughout the Pomona Valley.

The star and the two-story home to which it was attached were destroyed October 25, 2003 in the Grand Prix Fire that swept through the area. More than $20,000 was raised to assist the property owner in rebuilding the star, so a temporary replacement measuring 65 feet tall was erected with a crane during the 2003-2005 holiday seasons. The star was not lit in 2006 after its copper wiring was stolen from the site. Because of this, hundreds of residents of San Antonio Heights purchased smaller stars that year and put those on their houses during the holiday season. It's a tradition that has continued.

Ken Petschow, a commercial airline pilot who owns the property, lit the star again beginning in 2007.

The community holds three annual events: A pancake breakfast on the weekend preceding Memorial Day, a Steakfest in mid-September—both at San Antonio Park—and a Holiday Sing-Along on Christmas Eve at Local Fire Station 12.

Government

The unincorporated community is in San Bernardino County's Second District and is overseen by the county. A homeowners' group, San Antonio Heights Association, advocates for various issues related to the Heights community.

References

Census-designated places in San Bernardino County, California
Populated places in San Bernardino County, California
Pomona Valley
San Gabriel Mountains
Census-designated places in California